The flag of Ingushetia, in the Russian Federation, was adopted in 1994.  It shows a red triskelion symbol on a white background, with narrow green horizontal stripes above and below.

The flag was officially commended by TFE in 2010.

Symbolism
In the religion and philosophy of the Ingush people, the Solar emblem (in the center of the flag) represents not only the sun and the universe but also awareness of the oneness of the spirit in the past, present and future.  The red recalls the struggle of the Ingush people for existence and in the defense of their homeland.  The white symbolizes the divine purity of the thoughts and views of the nation.  The green is the symbol of Islam.

Historical flags

Gallery

See also
Coat of arms of Ingushetia

References

External links
Flags of the World

Flag
Flags of the federal subjects of Russia
Flags introduced in 1994
Ingushetia